Simpson Memorial United Methodist Church, historically known as the Simpson Memorial Methodist Episcopal Church, is a historic Methodist Episcopal Church, now United Methodist, located at Charleston, West Virginia. It was constructed in 1914 and is a nearly square building on a high foundation.  It features a high pitched hipped roof with platform and four story square bell tower. It is of late Gothic Revival styling with features common to many American Protestant churches of the early 20th century.

It was listed on the National Register of Historic Places in 1991.

References

External links
 Church website
 National Register of Historic Places Inventory Nomination Form

20th-century Methodist church buildings in the United States
African-American history of West Virginia
Buildings and structures in Charleston, West Virginia
Churches in Kanawha County, West Virginia
Gothic Revival church buildings in West Virginia
National Register of Historic Places in Charleston, West Virginia
Churches on the National Register of Historic Places in West Virginia
Churches completed in 1914
United Methodist churches in West Virginia
Methodist Episcopal churches in the United States